Massachusetts House of Representatives' 28th Middlesex district in the United States is one of 160 legislative districts included in the lower house of the Massachusetts General Court. It covers the city of Everett in Middlesex County. Since 2015, Joseph W. Mcgonagle, Jr. of the Democratic Party has represented the district.

The current district geographic boundary overlaps with that of the Massachusetts Senate's Middlesex and Suffolk district.

Representatives
 Jarrett T. Barrios, 1998-2001 
 Edward G. Connolly
 Stephen Stat Smith
 Wayne A. Matewsky
 Joseph W. Mcgonagle, Jr, 2015-current

See also
 List of Massachusetts House of Representatives elections
 List of Massachusetts General Courts
 Other Middlesex County districts of the Massachusetts House of Representatives: 1st, 2nd, 3rd, 4th, 5th, 6th, 7th, 8th, 9th, 10th, 11th, 12th, 13th, 14th, 15th, 16th, 17th, 18th, 19th, 20th, 21st, 22nd, 23rd, 24th, 25th, 26th, 27th, 29th, 30th, 31st, 32nd, 33rd, 34th, 35th, 36th, 37th
 List of former districts of the Massachusetts House of Representatives

Images
Portraits of legislators

References

External links
 Ballotpedia
  (State House district information based on U.S. Census Bureau's American Community Survey).

House
Government of Middlesex County, Massachusetts